Salvador Camacho Roldán (January 1, 1827 – June 19, 1900) was a Colombian lawyer, businessman and politician who, as Presidential Designate, served as President of Colombia ad interim in 1868 and again in 1871. He also served as Congressman in both houses, Governor of Panama, and Secretary Foreign Affairs, of Finance and Development, and of Treasury and Public Credit.

Works
The following is a chronological list of works authored by Camacho Roldán:

See also
 Víctor Mosquera Chaux

References

Further reading
 

1827 births
1900 deaths
People from Casanare Department
Del Rosario University alumni
Colombian economists
19th-century Colombian lawyers
Academic staff of the Free University of Colombia
Colombian sociologists
Members of the Chamber of Representatives of Colombia
Members of the Senate of Colombia
Foreign ministers of Colombia
Colombian Secretaries of Finance and Development
Colombian Secretaries of Treasury and Public Credit
Presidential Designates of Colombia